Introducing Raycharles Lamontagne is a self-released album by Ray LaMontagne, released in 2003.

It mostly contains early versions of songs that would later appear on Ray LaMontagne's major-label debut, Trouble.

Track listing
 "Trouble"
 "Burn In My Skin"
 "Country Girl"
 "Hannah"
 "How Come" (Acoustic)
 "Please"
 "Shelter"
 "The Narrow Escape"
 "All the Wild Horses"

Ray LaMontagne albums